This article lists the poems of Catullus and their various properties.

Catullus' poems can be divided into three groups:

the polymetrics (poems 1–60)
the long poems (poems 61–68)
the epigrams (poems 69–116)

Historical context

Catullus (c. 84 BC - c. 54 BC) lived in the waning days of the Roman Republic, just before the Imperial era that began with Augustus. Catullus is the chief representative of a school of poets known as the poetae novi or neoteroi, both terms meaning "the new poets". Their poems were a bold departure from traditional models, being relatively short and describing everyday occurrences and intense personal feelings; by contrast, traditional poetry was generally large and epic, describing titanic battles among heroes and gods. These avant-garde poets drew inspiration from earlier Greek authors, especially Sappho and Callimachus; Catullus himself used Sapphic meter in two poems, Catullus 11 and 51, the second of which is almost a translation. His poems are written in a variety of meters, with hendecasyllabic verse and elegiac couplets being the most common by far.

Catullus is renowned for his love poems, particularly the 25 poems addressed to a woman named Lesbia, of which Catullus 5 is perhaps the most famous. Scholars generally believe that Lesbia was a pseudonym for Clodia and that the name Lesbia is likely an homage to Sappho, who came from the isle of Lesbos. Catullus is also admired for his elegies, especially Catullus 101 and Catullus 96, for his hymn to his homeland, Sirmio, in Catullus 31, and for his many depictions of everyday life in ancient Rome, such as Catullus 4, Catullus 10, and Catullus 13. Finally, he was well-nigh infamous even in his own time for his fierce, sometimes obscene, invectives against faithless friends (e.g., Catullus 12, Catullus 16, and Catullus 116), faithless lovers (Catullus 8, Catullus 30, Catullus 58, and Catullus 70), corrupt politicians (Catullus 28, Catullus 29), and bad poets (Catullus 14 and Catullus 44).

Catullus was admired in ancient times for his elegantly crafted poems, and inspired many of the next generation of poets, especially Ovid, Tibullus, and Sextus Propertius. Even Virgil and Horace are also known to have adopted some elements of his poetry, although the latter was also critical of his work. Martial seems to be the only later Latin poet to be influenced significantly by Catullus. Catullus is mentioned by a few other Roman scholars, such as Pliny the Younger and Quintilian, and by St. Jerome. Since Catullus' work was not adopted as part of a classical curriculum, it was gradually forgotten over time, although one Bishop Rather of Verona is said to have delighted in reading his poems c. 965 AD. That changed c. 1300 AD, with the discovery of a manuscript that contained 116 poems by Catullus.

Manuscript tradition

Almost all of Catullus' poems survived from antiquity in a single manuscript discovered c. 1300 in the Chapter Library of Verona, conventionally called "V" for the "Verona codex"; legend has it that the manuscript was found underneath a beer barrel. Two copies were made from the V manuscript, which was then lost. One of the copies was itself copied twice, after which it was lost in turn. Hence, Catullus' works depend on three surviving copies of the single V manuscript. The first printed edition (edito princeps) of Catullus appeared in Venice in 1472; the following year, Francesco Puteolano published the second printed edition in Parma.

For fourteen centuries (c. 1st century BC- c. 14th century AD), the poems of Catullus were copied by hand from other hand-written copies, a process that gradually led to a few errors in the received text. Scholars have applied methods of textual criticism to undo these errors and reconstruct Catullus' original text as much as possible. As an early example, Puteolano stated in the second edition (1473) that he made extensive "corrections" of the previous (1472) edition. In 1577, J. J. Scaliger published an emended version of Catullus' works, using the then novel genealogical method of textual criticism. Scholars since then have worked to emend these reconstructions to approximate more closely the original poems of Catullus; examples of these variant readings and emendations are given in the footnotes to the text below.

Main list

The table below lists all of Catullus' extant poems, with links to the full text, the poetic meter, the number of lines, and other data. The entire table can be sorted according to any column by clicking on the arrows in the topmost cell. The "Type" column is color-coded, with a green font indicating poems for or about friends, a magenta font marking his famous poems about his Lesbia, and a red font indicating invective poems. The "Addressee(s)" column cites the person to whom Catullus addresses the poem, which ranges from friends, enemies, targets of political satire, and even a sparrow.

References

Bibliography

Further reading

The following is merely a listing of a few sources that English-speaking readers may find useful in pursuing further research on Catullus.
 
Critical edition/textual criticism
 
 

Latin editions
 
 
 

English translations
 
 
 
 
 
 

Bilingual editions
 
 
 

Catullus' vocabulary
   A concordance specifying the poem, line and case in which each word appears, e.g., hortulus appears in the ablative case hortulo in line 88 of Catullus' poem 61. Definitions for the words are not given.
  This book lists the vocabulary, with definitions, needed to read Catullus' polymetric poems. After a general introduction to Catullus' vocabulary, a separate vocabulary list is given for subsets of 2–3 poems, e.g., poems 6–8 and 9–10. The words in each list is grouped by  declension and gender for nouns and by conjugation for verbs.

Scholarship
 
 
 
 
 
 
 
 

 List
Catullus
Articles containing video clips